UFC 16: Battle in the Bayou was a mixed martial arts event held by the Ultimate Fighting Championship on March 13, 1998 in New Orleans, Louisiana. The event was seen live on pay per view in the United States, and later released on home video.

History
UFC 16 featured the first ever UFC Welterweight tournament in the USA (for fighters under 170 lb), as well as a Light Heavyweight Championship bout, a Heavyweight and a Light Heavyweight Superfight, and two alternate bouts in case of tournament injury.

UFC 16 marked the first appearance of the influential fighter Pat Miletich, who would go on to create Miletich Fighting Systems. Tank Abbott is a guest commentator for the Heavyweight Superfight.

The UFC Light Heavyweight Championship bout, was billed to be champion Frank Shamrock's biggest test, in Battlecade star, Igor Zinoviev. This would end up being the final match of Zinoviev's career, as he suffered a career-ending collarbone injury from Shamrock's victorious KO slam.

Kimo Leopoldo returned to the UFC at UFC 16 and fought top Japanese fighter Tsuyoshi Kohsaka. Kimo dominated the first portion of the fight but began to fatigue and eventually lost the fight by decision.

Results

UFC 16 Welterweight Tournament Bracket

1 Mikey Burnett withdrew from the tournament due to a broken finger and was replaced by Chris Brennan.

See also 
 Ultimate Fighting Championship
 List of UFC champions
 List of UFC events
 1998 in UFC

References

External links
UFC16 results at Sherdog.com

Ultimate Fighting Championship events
1998 in mixed martial arts
Mixed martial arts in New Orleans
MMA
1998 in sports in Louisiana